Stanislav Khristenko ; born May 25, 1984 in Kharkov, Ukraine, is a Ukrainian-American concert pianist.

Life

Stanislav Khristenko was born in Kharkiv, Ukraine into a  Ukrainian-Jewish family and started taking piano lessons at the age of 7. He got his professional training at Moscow Tchaikovsky Conservatory and Cleveland Institute of Music.

Career

In 2010, Khristenko made his Vienna Konzerthaus debut and released his Ernest Krenek Works CD on Oehms Classics.

In 2013, Khristenko won the Maria Canals International Music Competition, Cleveland Piano Competition,  and Fourth prize at the Queen Elisabeth Piano Competition.

In 2014, Khristenko made his debut in Zankel Hall at Carnegie Hall and released his album Fantasies on the Steinway recording label 

In February 2015, Khristenko was officially added to the roster of Steinway Artists. In the summer of 2015, he also debuted at the Ravinia Festival and released the first volume of his recording of Ernst Krenek's piano works on Toccata Classics

Recordings

 2020 – Toccata Classics – Ernst Krenek: Piano Music Volume Two
 2015 – Toccata Classics – Ernst Krenek: Piano Music Volume One
 2014 – Steinway & Sons Label – Fantasies
 2013 – Queen Elisabeth Competition Winners CD
 2012 – Oehms Classics – Ernst Krenek Piano Works

Awards

2013

Cleveland International Piano Competition (USA, I prize)

Queen Elizabeth Competition (Belgium, IV prize)

Maria Canals International Music Competition (Spain, I prize)

2012

Parnassos International Piano Competition (Mexico, I prize)

UNISA International Piano Competition (South Africa, III prize)

2011

V Campillos International Piano Competition (Spain, I prize)

Almaty International Piano Competition (Kazakhstan, I prize)

2010

"Citta di Cantu" International Competition for Piano and Orchestra 
(Italy, I prize & Grand Prix)

Jose Iturbi International Piano Competition  (Los Angeles, CA, USA, I prize)

2009

Bosendorfer International Piano Competition (Tempe, AZ, I prize)

Virginia Waring International Piano Competition (Palm Desert, CA, I & II prizes)

2008

Isang Yun International Piano Competition (South Korea, II prize)

Wideman International Piano Competition (Shreveport, LA, USA, I prize)

2007

1st International Gaidamovich Chamber Music Competition (Russia, I prize)

International Rubinstein Chamber Music Competition (Russia, II prize)

2006

Mauro Paolo Monopoli Prize International Piano Competition (Italy, I prize)

Takamatsu International Piano Competition (Japan, II prize )

"Benedetto XIII prize" International Piano Competition (Italy, I prize)

2005

Cleveland International Piano Competition (USA, III prize)

Pausylipon Prize International Piano Competition (Italy, I prize )

2004

Dimitrios Vikelas International Piano Competition (Greece, I prize)

1999

Kosice International Piano Competition (Slovakia, I prize)

1998

Ettlingen International Piano Competition for young pianists (Germany, IV prize)

References

External links
 Stanislav Khristenko Official Web Site 

1984 births
Living people
Cleveland International Piano Competition prize-winners